SDCA can refer to:

Stochastic dual coordinate ascent, a mathematical optimisation algorithm.
St. Dominic College of Asia, a college in the Philippines.
the Small Drum Corps Association.